Carlfriesite is a rare tellurium mineral with the formula CaTe4+2Te6+O8, or more simplified: CaTe3O8. It has a Moh's hardness of 3.5 and it occurs in various shades of yellow, ranging from bright yellow to a light buttery color. It was named after Carl Fries Jr. (1910–1965) from the U.S. Geological Survey and the Geological Institute of the National University, Mexico City, Mexico. It was previously thought to have the formula H4Ca(TeO3)3, but this was proven to be incorrect. It has no uses beyond being a collector's item.

Occurrence 
Carlfriesite is often found in cavities in hydrothermal gold-tellurium deposits. It is found associated with cerussite, chlorargyrite, argentian gold, cesbronite, calcite, dickite, baryte, bornite, galena, hessite and tlapallite. It was first identified in the Bambollita (La Oriental), Moctezuma, Municipio de Moctezuma, Sonora, Mexico. It is also found in another nearby mine, namely the Moctezuma mine.

Synthesis 
Carlfriesite was found to be synthesizable by heating a mixture of CaO, Te(OH)6 and TeO2 to 150-240°C with water at the vapor pressure of the system. The resulting material was very fine-grained and colorless, consisting of aggregates of tiny carlfriesite plates. The material mostly consisted of carlfriesite, but also contained 10-15% paratellurite, as determined by X-ray diffraction.

See also 
 List of minerals
 List of minerals named after people

References 

Tellurate and selenate minerals
Calcium minerals
Monoclinic minerals
Minerals in space group 15